Nitocris of Babylon (c. 550 BC) is an otherwise unknown queen regnant of Babylon described by Herodotus in his Histories. According to Histories of Herodotus, Among sovereigns of Babylon two were women, Semiramis and Nitocris. Nitocris is credited by Herodotus with various building projects in Babylon. She is also said to have tricked Darius I by placing her tomb above a gate so that no Persian could pass below and enter through. According to the account, Darius was lured in by a mysterious inscription that served as a trap for greedy kings. According to Herodotus she was the wife of Nabonidus (Gr. Labynetus) against whose son an expedition was launched by Cyrus the Great. Dougherty and Beaulieu identify the son as Belshazzar.

If this is the case, she is most likely the queen in the story of Belshazzar's feast, and she is identified as such in Handel's oratorio Belshazzar.

Identity of Nitocris
In the past, various hypotheses have been proposed to link her with one or several known persons:
 Naqi'a, wife of Sanherib, known for building activities
 Adad-happe, the historical mother of Nabonidus, last king of Babylon
 an otherwise unknown wife of Nebuchadnezzar II or a daughter of his. The latter view is the most commonly accepted.

It is possible as well that Nabonidus married one of Nebuchadnezzar II's daughters, a marriage which could potentially have been secured through his mother's influence. Not only would such a connection explain Nabonidus's rise to the throne (being connected to the royal family) but it would also explain later historical traditions in which Nabonidus's son, Belshazzar, is described as Nebuchadnezzar II's descendant; as in the Book of Daniel in the Hebrew Bible, where Belshazzar is referred to as Nebuchadnezzar II's (grand)son. William H. Shea proposed in 1982, that Nitocris may tentatively be identified as the name of Nabonidus's wife and Belshazzar's mother.

See also
 Kings of Babylon

References

6th-century BC women
Babylonian women
Neo-Babylonian Empire
Ancient queens regnant
Nabonidus
6th-century BC people
Chaldean dynasty